Frank P. Treanor (May 11, 1855 in New York City – August 9, 1933 in Monument Beach, Barnstable County, Massachusetts) was an American businessman and politician from New York.

Life
He attended the College of St. Francis Xavier, and the College of the Holy Cross.

He was a member of the New York State Assembly (New York Co., 17th D.) in 1880. In 1882, he became a partner in his older brother's bluestone business in Hastings-on-Hudson. He was a member of the New York State Senate (11th D.) in 1882 and 1883.

In 1886, he removed to Yonkers, and was Police Commissioner of Yonkers for some time.

He was a business partner of William H. Clark who built the Empire Race Track, and was Superintendent of the track at the time of Clark's death.

Treanor died on August 9, 1933, during a summer vacation at Monument Beach, Massachusetts.

Sources
 Civil List and Constitutional History of the Colony and State of New York compiled by Edgar Albert Werner (1884; pg. 291)
 Sketches of the Members of the Legislatures in The Evening Journal Almanac (1883)
 WILLIAM H. CLARK DEAD in NYT on February 18, 1900
 F. P. Treanor, Formerly Of Hastings, Dies in The Hastings News on August 11, 1933

1855 births
1933 deaths
Democratic Party New York (state) state senators
Businesspeople from New York City
Democratic Party members of the New York State Assembly
College of the Holy Cross alumni